The 1996 Basildon District Council election took place on 2 May 1996 to elect members of Basildon District Council in Essex, England. This was on the same day as other local elections. One third of the council was up for election; the seats which were last contested in 1992. The Labour Party (UK) gained control of the council, which had previously been under no overall control, for the first time since 1991.

Overall results

|-
| colspan=2 style="text-align: right; margin-right: 1em" | Total
| style="text-align: right;" | 14
| colspan=5 |
| style="text-align: right;" | 43,165
| style="text-align: right;" |

All comparisons in vote share are to the corresponding 1992 election.

Ward results

Billericay East

Billericay West

Burstead

Fryerns Central

Fryerns East

Laindon

Langdon Hills

Lee Chapel North

Nethermayne

Pitsea East

Pitsea West

Vange

Wickford North

Wickford South

References

1996
1996 English local elections
1990s in Essex